Drover Town Historic District is a national historic district located at Huntington, Huntington County, Indiana.   The district includes 231 contributing buildings, 2 contributing structures, and 1 contributing object in a predominantly residential section of Huntington. It developed between about 1857 and 1930 and includes notable examples of Federal, Greek Revival, Gothic Revival, Italianate, and Queen Anne style architecture. Located in the district are the separately listed German Reformed Church, Samuel Purviance House, and William Street School.  Other notable buildings include the William Drover House (c. 1880), John Rhoads House (1896), and Griffiths Block (1896).

It was listed on the National Register of Historic Places in 2006.

References

Historic districts on the National Register of Historic Places in Indiana
Italianate architecture in Indiana
Queen Anne architecture in Indiana
Federal architecture in Indiana
Greek Revival architecture in Indiana
Gothic Revival architecture in Indiana
Historic districts in Huntington County, Indiana
National Register of Historic Places in Huntington County, Indiana